The Eeuwfeestkliniek is a surgical hospital in Antwerp, Belgium.

Built in 1930, it was constructed on the centenary of Belgium for the city of Antwerp. After World War II, it came under the control of the Augustinian nuns and in the 1980s became part of the Monica healthcare umbrella. It was extensively renovated in the 1990s. The hospital specialises in oncology, Emergency medical services, Cardiothoracic Surgery and Oral and maxillofacial surgery.

See also
List of hospitals in Belgium

External links

Hospital Home Page

Hospital buildings completed in 1930
Hospitals established in 1930
Hospitals in Belgium
Buildings and structures in Antwerp
1930 establishments in Belgium